The Thomas J. Watson Research Center is the headquarters for IBM Research. The center comprises three sites, with its main laboratory in Yorktown Heights, New York, U.S., 38 miles (61 km) north of New York City, Albany, New York  and with offices in Cambridge, Massachusetts.

Overview 

The center, headquarters of IBM's Research division, is named for both Thomas J. Watson, Sr. and Thomas Watson, Jr., who led IBM as president and CEO, respectively, from 1915 (when it was known as the Computing-Tabulating-Recording Company) to 1971.

The research is intended to improve hardware (physical sciences and semiconductors research), services (business modelling, consulting, and operations research), software (programming languages, security, speech recognition, data management, and collaboration tools), and systems (operating systems and server design), as well as to extend the mathematics and science that support the information technology industry.

The center was founded at Columbia University in 1945 as the Watson Scientific Computing Laboratory, on 116th Street in Manhattan, expanding to 115th Street in 1953. More labs were later opened in Westchester County, New York beginning in the late 1950s with the temporary facility and research headquarters at the former Robert S. Lamb estate  in Croton-on-Hudson, New York, with others in Yorktown Heights, and downtown Ossining. The new headquarters were finally located with a new lab in Yorktown Heights  designed by architect Eero Saarinen completed in 1961, with the 115th Street site closing in 1970.  IBM later donated the New York City buildings to Columbia University; they are now known as the Casa Hispanica and Watson Hall. The lab expanded to Hawthorne in 1984.

Notable staff have included the mathematicians Benoît Mandelbrot, Ralph E. Gomory, Shmuel Winograd, Alan Hoffman, Don Coppersmith,  Gregory Chaitin, physicist and presidential advisor Richard Garwin, inventor Robert Dennard, roboticist Matthew T. Mason, author Clifford A. Pickover, computer scientists Frances E. Allen, John Cocke, Stuart Feldman, Ken Iverson, Irene Greif, and Mark N. Wegman, Barry Appelman, Wietse Venema, Harry Markowitz (Economics Nobel Prize, 1990), electrical engineer Jeffrey Kephart, and physicists Llewellyn Thomas, Rolf Landauer, Charles H. Bennett, Elliott H. Lieb, J. B. Gunn, Leroy Chang, Leo Esaki (Physics Nobel Prize, 1973), Jay Gambetta, Uri Sivan (president of the Technion – Israel Institute of Technology), and Zvi Galil (former president of Tel Aviv University).

The work done at the center from 1960 to 1984 was named an IEEE Milestone in 2009.

Supercomputers
As of November 2010, the center houses three TOP500 supercomputers; the oldest and still fastest of which, a BlueGene/L system designed for protein folding simulations, called BGW (Blue Gene Watson), entered the list in the 06/2005 issue, then positioned second behind fellow Blue Gene/L in LLNL.

Another well-known installation is Watson, an artificial intelligence system capable of answering natural language questions, which won several Jeopardy! games against human contestants in February 2011 on the site, and defeated Jeopardy! super-champions Ken Jennings and Brad Rutter.

Buildings

Yorktown Heights
The Yorktown Heights building, housing the headquarters of IBM Research, situated on private land not generally accessible to the public, is a large crescent-shaped structure consisting of three levels with 40 aisles each, radiating out from the center of the circle described by the crescent. Due to this construction, none of the offices have windows. The lowest level is partially underground in some areas toward the shorter side of the crescent, which also leads to the employee parking lots. A large overhang protrudes from the front entryway of the building, and faces the visitor parking lot. The building houses a library, an auditorium and a cafeteria. It was designed by the architect Eero Saarinen and built in 1956–1961.  The original building named Mohansic, for the area, was in Yorktown Heights; this building is in Yorktown proper. The Mohansic building was the temporary area for Research while the  TJ  Watson building was being constructed. 
Albany NanoTech
The facility can be found at 257 Fuller Rd, Albany, New York; it is located in facilities owned by the State University of New York's Polytechnic Institute's Colleges of Nanoscale Science and Engineering (SUNY-CNSE) which also hosts the Center for Semiconductor Research (CSR). The IBM occupied portion of the site is the main facility of IBM Research's Semiconductor Group. The group focuses on next generation semiconductor technology research, and is the group most associated with a number of innovations related to semiconductor scaling, including the introduction of a 7 nm test chip in 2015, a 5 nm test chip in 2017. and a 2 nm test chip in 2021. This group operates an advanced extreme ultraviolet lithography enabled research line which is used to support their research both in support of and beyond traditional scaling. This work is done in a collaborative ecosystem based environment which includes academic and industrial partners.
Cambridge
The Cambridge research lab can be found at 75 Binney Street, Cambridge, Massachusetts; it is located in the IBM Watson Health HQ. Research at Cambridge focuses on AI.
Hawthorne
The Hawthorne building was a leased facility located on Skyline Drive, which is part of an industrial park shared by several area businesses.  In 2012 the Hawthorne lease was closed by IBM and remaining employees were relocated to the Yorktown Heights site.  The Hawthorne building (located at 19 Skyline Drive) is easily recognizable by its mirrored facade and large blue pole. Located approximately 25 miles north of New York City, the Hawthorne site was smaller than its sister site at Yorktown Heights (with none of the wet lab space found in the Yorktown Heights facility). The primary focus at Hawthorne was software- and services-related research, whereas Yorktown Heights focuses on chemistry, mathematics, physics, silicon technology, and electrical engineering research, as well as some software and services. The building also contained a cafeteria, presentation center and library. The site, opened in 1984, was designed by Michael Harris Spector. The building is now part of New York Medical College

See also
 Tech companies in the New York metropolitan area

Notes and references

Bibliography 
 

 500+ pages, including several chapters on IBM's Watson Scientific Computing Laboratory at Columbia University in the 1940s and 50s. Also available in PDF.

External links
 Wallace J. Eckert founder and director of the Watson Scientific Computing Laboratory at Columbia University
 IBM Watson Laboratory at Columbia University
 The Thomas J. Watson Astronomical Computing Bureau (1937)
 Watson Lab Gallery
 Thomas J. Watson Research Center
 Nine color 1961 photographs by G. E. Kidder Smith of the IBM Thomas J. Watson Research Center in  Kitchawan Road, Yorktown Heights
 IBM Research Division

IBM facilities
Supercomputer sites
Eero Saarinen structures
Modernist architecture in New York (state)
Yorktown, New York
Computer science research organizations
Buildings and structures in Westchester County, New York
Buildings and structures completed in 1961
Laboratories in the United States